The Executive Mayor of Bulawayo is the executive of the government of Bulawayo, Zimbabwe. The Mayor is a member of the Bulawayo City Council, and is assisted by a deputy mayor. The Mayor uses the style "His Worship". The current mayor is Solomon Mguni since 2018.

History 
Bulawayo's first mayor, Isidore Hirschler, took office on 25 November 1897. In 1981, following Zimbabwe's independence from the United Kingdom, Bulawayo's first black mayor, Naison Ndlovu, took office.

List of mayors 
The following is a list of past mayors of Bulawayo.

References 

Lists of political office-holders in Zimbabwe
Bulawayo